Aby-Mohoua is a village in south-eastern Ivory Coast. It is in the sub-prefecture of Etuéboué, Adiaké Department, Sud-Comoé Region, Comoé District.

Aby-Mohoua was a commune until March 2012 under the name Aby-Adjouan-Mohoua, when it became one of 1126 communes nationwide that were abolished.

Notes

Former communes of Ivory Coast
Populated places in Comoé District
Populated places in Sud-Comoé